Atoyac is a municipality in Veracruz, Mexico. It is located about 196 km from state capital Xalapa. It has a surface of 171.09 km2.

The municipality of Atoyac is delimited to the north by Tepatlaxco, to the east by Paso del Macho, to the south-east by Cuitláhuac, to the south by Yanga, to the west by Amatlán de los Reyes

It produces principally maize and beans.

In Atlahuilco, from the 18 to the 19 of March takes place the celebration in honor to San José, Patron of the place.

References

External links 

  Municipal Official Site
  Municipal Official Information

Municipalities of Veracruz